Main page: List of Canadian plants by family

Families:
A | B | C | D | E | F | G | H | I J K | L | M | N | O | P Q | R | S | T | U V W | X Y Z

Ulmaceae 

 Ulmus americana — American elm
 Ulmus rubra — slippery elm
 Ulmus thomasii — rock elm

Urticaceae 

 Boehmeria cylindrica — smallspike false nettle
 Laportea canadensis — Canada wood-nettle
 Parietaria pensylvanica — Pennsylvania pellitory
 Pilea fontana — springs clearweed
 Pilea pumila — Canada clearweed
 Urtica dioica — stinging nettle

Valerianaceae 

 Plectritis congesta — pink plectritis
 Plectritis macrocera — white plectritis
 Valeriana capitata — clustered valerian
 Valeriana dioica — wood valerian
 Valeriana edulis — hairy valerian
 Valeriana scouleri — Scouler's valerian
 Valeriana sitchensis — Sitka valerian
 Valeriana uliginosa — marsh valerian
 Valerianella chenopodiifolia — goosefoot cornsalad
 Valerianella umbilicata — navel-shape cornsalad

Verbenaceae 

 Glandularia bipinnatifida — Dakota vervain
 Phryma leptostachya — American lopseed
 Phyla lanceolata — fog-fruit
 Verbena bracteata — largebract vervain
 Verbena hastata — blue vervain
 Verbena simplex — narrowleaf vervain
 Verbena stricta — hoary vervain
 Verbena urticifolia — white vervain
 Verbena x deamii
 Verbena x engelmannii
 Verbena x perriana
 Verbena x rydbergii

Violaceae 

 Hybanthus concolor — green violet
 Viola adunca — sand violet
 Viola affinis — Le Conte's violet
 Viola bicolor — field pansy
 Viola biflora — northern violet
 Viola blanda — smooth white violet
 Viola canadensis — Canada violet
 Viola conspersa — American bog violet
 Viola cucullata — marsh blue violet
 Viola epipsila — northern marsh violet
 Viola glabella — smooth yellow woodland violet
 Viola howellii — Howell's violet
 Viola labradorica — Labrador violet
 Viola lanceolata — lanceleaf violet
 Viola langsdorffii — Aleutian violet
 Viola macloskeyi — smooth white violet
 Viola missouriensis — Missouri violet
 Viola nephrophylla — northern bog violet
 Viola novae-angliae — New England violet
 Viola nuttallii — Nuttall's violet
 Viola orbiculata — western rough-leaved violet
 Viola palustris — alpine marsh violet
 Viola pedata — bird's-foot violet
 Viola pedatifida — prairie violet
 Viola praemorsa — upland yellow violet
 Viola primulifolia — primrose-leaf violet
 Viola pubescens — downy yellow violet
 Viola purpurea — pine violet
 Viola renifolia — kidneyleaf white violet
 Viola rostrata — longspur violet
 Viola rotundifolia — roundleaf violet
 Viola sagittata — arrowleaf violet
 Viola selkirkii — great-spurred violet
 Viola sempervirens — redwood violet
 Viola septentrionalis — northern blue violet
 Viola sororia — woolly blue violet
 Viola striata — striped violet
 Viola triloba — three-lobed violet
 Viola vallicola — valley violet
 Viola x bissellii
 Viola x brauniae
 Viola x conjugens
 Viola x eclipes
 Viola x filicetorum
 Viola x malteana
 Viola x melissifolia
 Viola x palmata — early blue violet
 Viola x parca
 Viola x populifolia
 Viola x porteriana — Stone's violet
 Viola x primulifolia — primrose-leaf violet
 Viola x sublanceolata

Viscaceae 

 Arceuthobium americanum — American mistletoe
 Arceuthobium campylopodum — western dwarf-mistletoe
 Arceuthobium douglasii — Douglas-fir dwarf-mistletoe
 Arceuthobium laricis — larch dwarf-mistletoe
 Arceuthobium pusillum — dwarf mistletoe
 Arceuthobium tsugense — hemlock dwarf-mistletoe

Vitaceae 

 Parthenocissus quinquefolia — Virginia creeper
 Parthenocissus vitacea — woodbine
 Vitis aestivalis — summer grape
 Vitis labrusca — northern fox grape
 Vitis riparia — riverbank grape
 Vitis vulpina — winter grape

Woodsiaceae 

 Athyrium americanum — American alpine ladyfern
 Athyrium filix-femina — lady fern
 Cystopteris bulbifera — bulblet fern
 Cystopteris fragilis — fragile fern
 Cystopteris laurentiana — Laurentian bladderfern
 Cystopteris montana — mountain bladderfern
 Cystopteris protrusa — lowland brittle fern
 Cystopteris tenuis — upland brittle bladderfern
 Deparia acrostichoides — silver false spleenwort
 Diplazium pycnocarpon — glade fern
 Gymnocarpium disjunctum — Pacific oak fern
 Gymnocarpium dryopteris — northern oak fern
 Gymnocarpium jessoense — northern oak fern
 Gymnocarpium robertianum — limestone oak fern
 Gymnocarpium x achriosporum
 Gymnocarpium x brittonianum
 Gymnocarpium x intermedium
 Woodsia alpina — northern woodsia
 Woodsia glabella — smooth woodsia
 Woodsia ilvensis — rusty woodsia
 Woodsia obtusa — bluntlobe woodsia
 Woodsia oregana — western cliff fern
 Woodsia scopulina — Rocky Mountain woodsia
 Woodsia x abbeae
 Woodsia x gracilis
 Woodsia x maxonii
 Woodsia x tryonis

Canada,family,U